Daniel Shiraishi Rollemberg Albuquerque (born 16 February 1986), also known as Daniel Japonês, is a Brazilian futsal player of Japanese descent who plays as a winger for Joinville and the Brazilian national futsal team.

Honours
UEFA Futsal Champions League fourth place: 2018–19

References

External links
Liga Nacional Fútbol Sala profile

1986 births
Living people
Brazilian people of Japanese descent
Brazilian men's futsal players
Minas Tênis Clube players
Inter FS players
FC Barcelona Futsal players
Brazilian expatriate sportspeople in Spain